P'ukru (Quechua for hole, pit, gap in a surface, also spelled Phujro) or Phujru (Aymara for hole or pit in the earth without water, not very deep) is a  mountain in the Potosí mountain range in the Bolivian Andes. It is situated in the Potosí Department, Tomás Frías Province, in the south of the Potosí Municipality. P'ukru lies southwest of Khunurana and a mountain named Q'umir Qucha.

References 

Mountains of Potosí Department